Fuzhou Stadium (Simplified Chinese: 福建省奥林匹克体育中心), is a multi-purpose stadium in Fuzhou, China. It is currently used mostly for football matches. Fujian Olympic Sports Center has a capacity of 30,000 people, and the main stadium holds 23,000 spectators.

References

Football venues in China
Multi-purpose stadiums in China
Sports venues in Fujian
Sport in Fuzhou
Buildings and structures in Fuzhou